Whistling Smith is a 1975 Canadian short documentary film about Vancouver policeman Sergeant Bernie "Whistling" Smith, directed by Marrin Canell. It was nominated for an Academy Award for Best Documentary Short at the 48th Academy Awards.

Production
Whistling Smith was produced for the National Film Board's Pacificanada series, which aired on CBC-TV in early 1975. The film's narration was written and read by Donald Brittain.

Accolades
Along with its Oscar nomination, the film won a Canadian Film Award for Sound Re-Recording.

References

External links

Watch Whistling Smith at NFB Web site

1975 films
1975 documentary films
1975 short films
Canadian short documentary films
Documentary films about law enforcement in Canada
English-language Canadian films
Films shot in Vancouver
National Film Board of Canada documentaries
National Film Board of Canada short films
1970s short documentary films
1970s English-language films
1970s Canadian films